"Skrt" (stylized in all caps; pronounced "skirt") is a song by American rapper Kodak Black. It was released in December 2014 and is the third single from his mixtape Heart of the Projects (2014). It was produced by SkipOnDaBeat. In October 2015, the song helped Kodak Black gain recognition, when a video of Canadian rapper Drake dancing to it went viral.

Background
The single was released on December 25, 2014, and a music video for the song was released on October 19, 2015. Four days later, on October 23, 2015, Canadian musician Drake posted a video on Instagram of him dancing to the song in his private jet. The video became popular, leading to Kodak Black achieving national popularity.

Composition
Elias Leight wrote in The Fader that the song's beat "combines a stream of percussion and a few floating keyboard notes", and noted "fierce, distressed qualities to Kodak's loneliness". Zara Golden called the track melancholy.

Remix
Canadian rapper Roy Woods released a remix of the song on January 30, 2016.

Charts

Certifications

References

2014 singles
2014 songs
Kodak Black songs
Songs written by Kodak Black